Samuel Kňažko (born 7 August 2002) is a Slovak professional ice hockey defenceman who is currently playing for the Cleveland Monsters in the American Hockey League (AHL) as a prospect to the Columbus Blue Jackets of the National Hockey League (NHL).

Playing career
Kňažko was selected 78th overall by the Blue Jackets in the 2020 NHL Entry Draft.

After his selection by the Blue Jackets, Kňažko was signed to a three-year, entry-level contract with Blue Jackets on June 9, 2021.

International play

Kňažko served as Slovakia's captain in the 2021 and 2022 editions of the IIHF World Junior Championship.

He was selected to make his full IIHF international debut, participating for Slovakia in the 2021 IIHF World Championship.

Kňažko was selected for the 2022 Olympics in Beijing.

Career statistics

Regular season and playoffs

International

References

External links
 

2002 births
Living people
Cleveland Monsters players
Columbus Blue Jackets draft picks
HC TPS players
Ice hockey players at the 2022 Winter Olympics
Medalists at the 2022 Winter Olympics
Olympic bronze medalists for Slovakia
Olympic ice hockey players of Slovakia
Olympic medalists in ice hockey
Seattle Thunderbirds players
Slovak ice hockey defencemen
Sportspeople from Trenčín
Slovak expatriate ice hockey players in Finland
Slovak expatriate ice hockey players in the United States